This is a list of political conspiracies. In a political context, a conspiracy refers to a group of people united in the goal of damaging, usurping, or overthrowing an established political power. Typically, the final goal is to gain power through a revolutionary coup d'état or through assassination. A conspiracy can also be used for infiltration of the governing system.

List
 1971 BCE - Apophis Kush Alliance against Egypt as attested to in the second Kamose stele
 399 BCE – Conspiracy of Cinadon to overthrow the government of ancient Sparta to grant rights to helots and poorer Spartans
 63 BCE - First Catilinarian conspiracy and the Second Catilinarian conspiracy
 44 BCE - Liberatores plot assassination of Julius Caesar to restore Roman Republic
 65 CE - Pisonian conspiracy against Nero
 1478 Pazzi conspiracy, a plot by Pope Sixtus IV and the Pazzi family to depose the House of Medici in the Republic of Florence
 1506 - Conspiracy against the life of the brothers Alfonso I d'Este, Duke of Ferrara and Cardinal Ippolito d'Este in the Duchy of Ferrara, coordinated by their half brother Giulio d'Este and full brother Ferrante d'Este
 1569 - 1569 Plot against John III of Sweden.
 1570 - Ridolfi plot against Elizabeth I of England
 1574 - Mornay Plot against John III of Sweden.
 1583 - Throckmorton Plot by English Catholics led by Sir Francis Throckmorton to coordinate an invasion of England led by Henry I, Duke of Guise, to murder Elizabeth, and replace her with her cousin Mary, Queen of Scots
 1586 - Babington Plot, plot by Anthony Babington and John Ballard to assassinate Elizabeth and coordinate an invasion of England by King Philip II of Spain and the Holy League. Discovered by Sir Francis Walsingham and led to execution of Mary, Queen of Scots
 1603 - Main Plot to remove James I of England and enthrone Arbella Stuart allegedly led by Henry Brooke, Lord Cobham, and sponsored by Spain. 
 1603 - Bye Plot, leads to the execution of Sir George Brooke
 1605 - Gunpowder Plot to blow up the House of Lords by during the State Opening of Parliament as prelude to a popular revolt in the Midlands, during which James's nine-year-old daughter, Princess Elizabeth, was to be installed as the Catholic head of state; foiled after a letter to William Parker, 4th Baron Monteagle, and the discovery and arrest of Guy Fawkes. Often called the Gunpowder Treason Plot; origin of Guy Fawkes Day
 1718–1720 The Pontcallec conspiracy during the minority of Louis XV to overthrow the Regent Philippe II, Duke of Orléans in favour of Philip V of Spain
 1749 - Conspiracy of the Slaves by Muslim slaves in Hospitaller-ruled Malta to kill Grand Master Manuel Pinto da Fonseca and take over the island with the help of the Barbary states.
 1756 - Coup of 1756 was an attempted coup d'état planned by Queen Louisa Ulrika of Sweden to abolish the rule of the Riksdag of the Estates and reinstate absolute monarchy in Sweden.
 1788 - Anjala conspiracy
 1789 - 1789 Conspiracy (Sweden) against Gustav III of Sweden.
 1793 - Armfelt Conspiracy against Charles XIII of Sweden.
 1796 – The Conspiracy of the Equals, led by François-Noël 'Gracchus' Babeuf, which attempted to overthrow the Directoire
 1807 - The Burr conspiracy, an alleged plot by former Vice President of the United States Aaron Burr and a cabal of his supporters to establish an independent country in the American Southwest. The accusations would lead to Burr being arrested and later indicted for treason.
 1820 - The Cato Street Conspiracy, a plot to murder all the British Cabinet Ministers and the Prime Minister Lord Liverpool.  A police informer resulted in the arrest of 13 plotters.  Five conspirators were executed and five others were transported to Australia. 
 1832 - Georgian plot, assassination of the Russian imperial administration and restoration of the Georgian monarchy
 1865 - Abraham Lincoln assassination plot, to include assassination of cabinet members. It had originated as a plot by Confederate sympathizers to kidnap Lincoln and force the Union to negotiate for either a release of prisoners of war or an end to the American Civil War.
 1898 - The Dreyfus Affair, a coordinated attempt to falsely accuse Alfred Dreyfus of treason
 1914 - The Serbian Black Hand secret society aided the nationalist group Young Bosnia in planning and organizing the assassination Austrian Archduke Franz Ferdinand in Sarajevo, thereby triggering a series of events that resulted in World War I.
 1941 - Operation Spark, a planned attempt on the life of Adolf Hitler.
 1944 - July 20 Plot - An attempt to assassinate Hitler with suitcase bomb at a conference at the Wolf's Lair in Rastenburg, East Prussia, and then use Operation Valkyrie to grab power
 1945 - The Soviet Union's infiltration of the Manhattan Project through atomic spies such as George Koval and Klaus Fuchs. Soviet intelligence was eventually confirmed by a declassified U.S. Army Corps of Engineers report and the Venona project, and assisted the Soviet atomic bomb project.
 1951 - Rawalpindi conspiracy - failed coup against Liaquat Ali Khan, Prime Minister of Pakistan. 
 1953 - Iranian coup d'état - The Imperial Iranian Armed Forces restores the Shah of Iran, Mohammad Reza Pahlavi, and overthrows Prime Minister Mohammad Mosaddegh with the aid of CIA and MI6.
1959 - Bangkok Plot - a plan to overthrow Premier of Cambodia Prince Norodom Sihanouk, formulated by Cambodian politicians with international support.
 1971 - Ugandan coup d'état - Ugandan Army units loyal to General Idi Amin deposed the government of President Milton Obote while he was abroad attending the annual Commonwealth Heads of Government Meeting. 
 1972 - Watergate scandal - The burglary of the Democratic National Committee offices at the Watergate complex by CREEP and subsequent cover-up scandals that forced President Richard Nixon to resign in 1974.
 1973 - Chilean coup d'état -a group of military officers led by General Augusto Pinochet and backed by the CIA seized power from democratically-elected leftist President Salvador Allende, ending civilian rule and establishing a U.S.-backed dictatorship
 1981 - 23F - An attempted coup d'etat or putsch in Spain by the military where politicians in the Congress of Deputies were held hostage for 18 hours.  King Juan Carlos I denounced the coup in a televised address.  This caused the coup to eventually collapse.
 1984 - Brighton hotel bombing - attempted assassination of Margaret Thatcher and her cabinet by the Provisional IRA at the Grand Hotel in Brighton, resulted in the death of Deputy Chief Whip Anthony Berry.
 1984 - Rajneeshee bioterror attack
 1987 - Iran-Contra Affair - sale of arms to Iran to fund the Contras in Nicaragua by Reagan Administration officials to circumvent the Boland Amendment
 1990 - Nayirah testimony, a false testimony to the Congressional Human Rights Caucus organized by public relations firm Hill & Knowlton for the Kuwaiti government
 2001 - September 11 attacks - Attacks on the World Trade Center in New York City, the Pentagon in Arlington, Virginia, and a planned fourth target in Washington D.C. using hijacked airplanes by al-Qaeda.
 2003 - Plame affair - publication of Valerie Plame's employment as a covert CIA officer by Robert Novak, who learned it from Richard Armitage, after her husband Joseph C. Wilson published a New York Times op-ed expressing doubt that Saddam Hussein purchased uranium from Niger. Lead to conviction of Scooter Libby for obstruction of justice and perjury. 
 2015 - November 2015 Paris attacks - attacks on targets in Paris, including an Eagles of Death Metal concert at the Bataclan theatre and the Stade de France in Saint-Denis, conducted by coordinated teams of Islamic terrorists affiliated with ISIS.

Fabricated conspiracies
 1924 - The Zinoviev letter, published in the Daily Mail in London before the 1924 general election, is a forgery that impacted the vote. It was signed with the name of Grigory Zinoviev, a politician in the Soviet Union and the leader of the Communist International, and called on violent action by the Communist Party of Great Britain. It was devised by anti-Communist White Russian émigrés in Paris and the Labour Party blamed it for its defeat.
1938 - Presumed Hitler Youth Conspiracy, NKVD case in Moscow involving some 70 arrests and 40 executions of teenagers and adults, later found to be baseless

False flag operations
 1931 - The Mukden Incident or the Manchurian Incident - The Imperial Japanese Army sabotaged a railway section near a Chinese garrison at Beidaying as a pretext for a Japanese invasion of Manchuria.
 1939 - Shelling of Mainila - false-flag artillery attack by the Red Army to provide the Soviet Union with a pretext for the Winter War against Finland.
 1939 - Operation Himmler and its Gleiwitz incident - false-flag attacks, including on a radio station in Gleiwitz, by Nazi Germany and SS officers disguised as Polish Armed Forces personnel as a pretext for the invasion of Poland
 1954 - Lavon affair Operation Susannah, "False Flag" terrorism by Mossad

See also
 List of assassinations
 List of coups and coup attempts by country
 List of terrorist incidents
 List of conspiracy theories
 Seditious conspiracy
 History of espionage

References

Further reading
 Burnett, Thom. Conspiracy Encyclopedia: The Encyclopedia of Conspiracy Theories (2006)
 Critchlow, Donald T., John Korasick, Matthew C. Sherman, eds. Political Conspiracies in America: A Reader (2008) online
 Coward, Barry, and Julian Swann. Conspiracies and conspiracy theory in early modern Europe: from the Waldensians to the French revolution (Routledge, 2017).
 Dean, Jodi. Aliens in America: Conspiracy Culture from Outerspace to Cyberspace (Cornell University Press, 1998).
 Knight, Peter, ed. Conspiracy Theories in American History: An Encyclopedia (2003)
 Lewis, Jon E. The Mammoth Book of Cover-Ups: The 100 Most Terrifying Conspiracies of All Time (2008)  excerpt
 Newton, Michael, ed. Famous Assassinations in World History: An Encyclopedia (2 vol ABC-CLIO, 2014), covers 266 assassinations and attempted assassinations of world political leaders from 465 BCE to 2012. 
 Newton, Michael, ed.  The Encyclopedia of Conspiracies and Conspiracy Theories (2005)
 Sifakis, Carl. Encyclopedia of Assassinations (Facts on File 2001), 
 Wood, Gordon. “Conspiracy and the Paranoid Style: Causality and Deceit in the Eighteenth Century.” William and Mary Quarterly 39 (1982): 401–41. online US history

Politics-related lists
Political